Marcq-en-Baroeul Airport is a civil airport, located in the localities of Marcq-en-Barœul and Bondues,  north-northeast of Lille, French Flanders, France

Overview
The airport is a small grass airfield used for general aviation

History
During World War II, the airport was used by the British Royal Air Force as Advanced Landing Ground B-57 Lille/Wambrechies.

References
 SintDenijs-Westrem Marcq-en-Barœul Airport
 Johnson, David C. (1988), U.S. Army Air Forces Continental Airfields (ETO), D-Day to V-E Day; Research Division, USAF Historical Research Center, Maxwell AFB, Alabama.

Airports in Hauts-de-France